Defrage was an Estonian metal and rock band formed in 2007. 

The band had done numerous gigs in Estonia and won the MTV Eesti Award for Best Music Video in 2009 for "Save Us From Religion". They were known for selling their album in parking lots and public places to raise money for their tours.

History

Defrage started to have their first band rehearsals in early 2007 when Kari (rhythm guitarist) got a response from Mikk (solo guitarist) to his advertisement on the website metal.ee "looking for band members for an American style rock band". Soon after that Daniel (in early years bass guitar) and Sten (drums) joined for rehearsals which mainly took place in an old garage that belonged to Mikk's father. In the beginning the band just played and practiced together without a singer whom Kari looked for at the same time.

The band filmed a video for "Hotel Breakers" and released their album Jackal in January 2012.

After one year of touring in Europe, Defrage released their second album "The Sick Letter" in May 2013. Defrage performed at one of Europe's minor rock festivals called Nova Rock, which takes place every June in Austria.

Defrage disbanded sometime in 2014, before the creation of a new band called Illumenium, which includes former Defrage members Kari Kärner, Andre Kaldas and Kevin Presmann. The new band continues with some previous Defrage songs, including "The Sick Letter".

Former members
 Mikk Künnapas – solo guitar (2007-2008)
 Artjom Jevstajev – vocals (2009–2011)
 Kaspar Peterson – bass guitar (2009–2011)
 Daniel Leppsoo – solo guitar (2007–2011)
 Aleks Ohaka – solo guitar (2011–2014)
 Andres Arens – drums (2009–2014)
 Joonas Uus – bass (2011–2014)
 Argo Ollep – vocals (2007–2009, 2011–2014)
 Andre Kaldas – screaming vocals (2011–2014)
 Kari "Infinity" Kärner – rhythm guitar, vocals (2007–2014)
 Kevin Presmann – drums (2014)

Discography
 Save Us From Religion (EP) (2008)
 Save U.S. From Religion (Special Edition) (CD) (2010)
 Jackal (Album) (CD) (2011)
 The Sick Letter (Album) (CD) (2013)

References

External links 
 Facebook 

Estonian rock music groups
Estonian musical groups
Musical groups established in 2007